The Sheraton Grand Rio Hotel & Resort is a highrise resort hotel in the Leblon neighbourhood in Rio de Janeiro, Brazil. The hotel opened in 1974 and has 549 guest rooms. Sheraton is strategically located in Leblon, upscale neighbourhood in Rio's south zone. Next to the famous beaches of Ipanema and Barra da Tijuca. It is the unique hotel in town to offer exclusive  access to the beach.

Hotels established in 1974
Hotel buildings completed in 1974
Hotels in Rio de Janeiro (city)